A. Horlock and Co. was a marine and locomotive engineering company based in Northfleet in Kent.

History 

The company was founded at Northfleet in Kent in 1847 by Alfred Horlock. He leased land formerly owned by his uncle on which the Poynder & Medlicott "Lime Works" factory stood and built a new foundry, named the Northfleet Ironworks. The company mainly manufactured marine equipment and steam engines. 

In 1848, the Dinorwic Quarry in North Wales ordered two  gauge steam locomotives from Horlock. These were amongst the earliest Crampton locomotives built and were the only locomotives built by Horlock. They were named Fire Queen and Jenny Lind. In 1850, the company produced a schooner for the Channel Islands and France Steam Navigation Company. The boat was powered by two 20 hp steam engines and was made primarily of malleable iron.

Alfred Horlock testified at the 1849 Parliamentary commission inquiring into the application of iron for railway bridges and other structures. A. Horlock and Co suffered a series of robberies in 1851. The company was declared bankrupt in July 1853 and the factory was auctioned to shipbuilders Bell, Wells & Co, who resold it in 1857.

Surviving products 
The steam locomotive Fire Queen, built in 1848, is on display at the Penrhyn Castle Railway Museum near Bangor in North Wales.

References 

Horlock
Horlock
Horlock